Lancers International School is a school in Gurgaon, India which educates students from Kindergarten to Class XII. Boarding facilities are also available at the school for international students coming from different nooks and corners of the world.  Many are international students from Japan and South Korea. The school also house facilities of a cafeteria, dorm, indoor swimming pool, a library with numerous resources, state-of-the-art infrastructure as well as world class faculty.

History
The school was founded in 2008

See also
Education in India
Literacy in India  
List of institutions of higher education in Haryana

References

External links 
 Official website

Schools in Gurgaon